Here Is Love is the first live album by California-based worship collective Bethel Music. The album was released on October 12, 2010 by Bethel Music alongside Integrity Music. Jeremy Edwardson worked on the production of the album.

The album was recorded live at Bethel Church, Redding, California and it also featured Jesus Culture artists Chris Quilala, Kim Walker-Smith and Kristene DiMarco.

Critical reception

Paul Kerslake of Cross Rhythms, rated the album a perfect ten squares stating that the album was "great" for "This is a stunning worship album, well chosen worship songs that are new but familiar, arrangements that are worshipful and inspiring, honest and revealing times of worship that I feel privileged to be able to share." He concluded that it was "quite possibly the worship album of the year."

Track listing

Personnel
Adapted from AllMusic.

 Brandon Aaronson – bass
 Sylvia Bartel – violin
 Melissa Brodeur – background vocals
 Kyle Couillard – guitar, acoustic guitar
 Kristene DiMarco – vocals, background vocals
 Miguel Cruz – inside photo
 Jeremy Edwardson – engineer, producer
 Adam French – engineer
 Troy Glessner – mastering
 Ainslie Grosser – mixing
 Myriah Grubbs – cover photo
 Nathan Grubbs – design, graphics
 Lucas Hogg – drums
 Brian Johnson – executive producer, vocals, background vocals, acoustic guitar, electric guitar
 Jenn Johnson – vocals, background vocals
 Daniel Kalte – live sound
 Luke Manwaring – video director, video editor, video producer
 Leah Märi – vocals, background vocals
 Ian McIntosh – keyboards
 Dave Myrvold – stage sound
 Chris Quilala – vocals, backgrounds vocals, drums, guitar, electric guitar
 Martin Rosenhoff – cello
 Kim Walker-Smith – vocals

Release history

References

2010 live albums
Bethel Music albums